Qeqertarsuaq Island is an island of Greenland. It is located in Baffin Bay in the Kangerlussuaq Icefjord of the Upernavik Archipelago.

See also
List of islands of Greenland

References

External links
1:1,000,000 scale Operational Navigation Chart, Sheet B-8

Islands of the Upernavik Archipelago